A tip-up barrel is a type of semi-automatic pistol design in which the barrel can be swung up and away from the firing pin, pivoting around a hinge set into the frame near the muzzle. Such a design allows a round to be inserted directly into the chamber, rather than from a magazine. Shooters who lack the hand/arm strength needed to chamber the first round by racking the slide on a conventional pistol can take advantage of the tip-up barrel to begin firing.

Tip-up pistols
JO.LO.AR.
Taurus PT22
Beretta 3032 Tomcat
Beretta 950
Beretta 21A Bobcat
Beretta Cheetah (certain models)
Le Français (pistol)

References

Firearms